Could This Be Love? is a 2007 French comedy film directed by Pierre Jolivet.

Cast 
 Vincent Lindon - Lucas
 Sandrine Bonnaire - Elsa
 François Berléand - Roland Christin
 Kad Merad - Rachid
 Liane Foly - Jeanne Larozière
 Hélène de Saint-Père - Sophie
 Guilaine Londez - Birgitte

References

External links 

2007 comedy films
2007 films
French comedy films
Films directed by Pierre Jolivet
2000s French films
2000s French-language films